Bingo: The King of the Mornings is a 2017 Brazilian biographical drama film directed by Academy Awards nominee Daniel Rezende in his directorial debut. Written by Luiz Bolognesi, the screenplay is inspired in the life of Arlindo Barreto, one of many actors who played Bozo the Clown in Brazil. However, to avoid copyrights claim and preserve its creative freedom, the production does not use either the name of Bozo or Arlindo, adopting the fictional names of Bingo and Augusto, respectively.

The film was released in Brazil on August 24, 2017. On September 15, it was selected as the Brazilian entry for the Best Foreign Language Film at the 90th Academy Awards, but it was not nominated.

Plot

Inspired by a true story, Bingo: The King of the Mornings is a film about the man behind the mask. Augusto (Vladimir Brichta) is an artist looking for his place under the spotlight, following the footsteps of his mother (Ana Lúcia Torre), a stage artist in the 1950s. Restless in his search for applause, he finds a chance to conquer the crowds when he becomes "BINGO", a TV host clown from one of the audience leader's TV shows for children in the 1980s with the director Lucia (Leandra Leal) and the American producer Peter Olsen (Soren Hellerup). With makeup on, Augusto becomes an absolute success. But a clause on his contract forbids him to reveal his identity; an anonymous celebrity. Augusto turns into a clown who brings happiness to children across the country, but not to his own son, Gabriel (Cauã Martins), who sees his own father, idol and partner, distance himself while searching for fame. Filled with irony and humor, with the exaggerated pop look of the backstage universe of the 1980s Brazilian television, this film tells the incredible and surreal story of a man who finds his personal decay whilst looking for his artistic value.

Cast
 Vladimir Brichta as Augusto Mendes/Bingo
 Leandra Leal as Lúcia
 Emanuelle Araújo as Gretchen
 Tainá Müller as Angélica
 Ana Lúcia Torre as Marta Mendes
 Augusto Madeira as Vasconcelos
 Cauã Martins as Gabriel Mendes
 Pedro Bial as Armando
 Domingos Montagner as Aparício
 Soren Hellerup as Peter Olsen

The movie has a cameo appearance of Fia Fer, Mauricio Cid and Victor Faviero.

Reception

Critical response 

Bingo: The King of the Morings was highly acclaimed by the critics, Reviewing it for Veja, Isabela Boscov said that the film is "the most exciting, exuberant, bold and original movie made by a Brazilian filmmaker since the release of City of God, 15 years ago", praising its capacity to combine comicality to desperation. She also lauded the performance of Vladimir Brichta, calling it "a genuine tour de force", and highlighted the direction of Daniel Rezende for its "coherent and dynamic style". 
Ikon London Magazine called Vladimir Brichta's performance second to none: "In portraying Augusto, Vladimir channels a compelling character – confident, vibrant and fearless. While at the same time, consumed and crushed from understanding that no one will ever know his real name or recognise his unmasked face.".

Stephen Dalton wrote in The Hollywood Reporter that "Bingo: The King of the Mornings has a pleasingly retro aesthetic of lurid 1980s fashions, scratchy VHS video effects and perky period pop hits. Brichta gives a compellingly wired performance, his fast-talking energy recalling the inspired intensity of vintage Robin Williams or Jim Carrey."

See also
 List of submissions to the 90th Academy Awards for Best Foreign Language Film
 List of Brazilian submissions for the Academy Award for Best Foreign Language Film

References

External links
 

Warner Bros. films
2017 films
2017 biographical drama films
Brazilian biographical drama films
Films about clowns
Cultural depictions of Brazilian men
2010s Portuguese-language films
2017 drama films